Alessandro Morbidelli may refer to:

Alessandro Morbidelli (footballer) (born 1989), Italian football/soccer player
Alessandro Morbidelli (astronomer) (born 1966), astronomer and planetary scientist